Pivdenmash, formerly known as Yuzhmash, meaning Southern Engineering, is a Ukrainian state-owned aerospace manufacturer. It was formerly a Soviet state-owned factory prior to 1991.

Pivdenmash produces spacecraft, launch vehicles (rockets), liquid-propellant rockets, landing gears, castings, forgings, tractors, tools, and industrial products. The company is headquartered in Dnipro, and reports to the State Space Agency of Ukraine. It works with international aerospace partners in 23 countries.

History 

Pivdenmash operated initially as "plant 586" in the Soviet Union. In 1954, Ukrainian aviation engineer Mikhail Yangel established the autonomous design bureau designated OKB-586, from the former chief designer's division of plant 586. Yangel had previously headed OKB-1 (today RKK Energiya)  and was primarily a supporter of storable propellant technology – unlike Sergei Korolev at OKB-1, who was a supporter of missiles using cryogenic propellants. To pursue development of ballistic missiles using storable liquid propellants, Mikhail Yangel had received authorization to convert the chief designer's division of the plant into an autonomous design bureau. Following this, OKB-586 was designated Southern Design Bureau (better known as KB Pivdenne) and plant 586 was renamed Southern Machine-Building Plant in 1966, with a focus on the design and production of ballistic missiles. The plant was later renamed Southern Machine-Building Production Union, or Yuzhmash (Ukraine).

Missiles produced at Pivdenmash included the first nuclear armed Soviet rocket R-5M (SS-3 'Shyster'), the R-12 Dvina (SS-4 'Sandal'), the R-14 Chusovaya (SS-5 'Skean'), the first widely deployed Soviet ICBM R-16 (SS-7 'Saddler'), the R-36 (SS-9 'Scarp'), the MR-UR-100 Sotka (SS-17 'Spanker'), and the R-36M (SS-18 'Satan'). During the Soviet era, the plant was capable of producing of up to 120 ICBMs a year. In the late 1980s, Pivdenmash was selected to be the main production facility of the RT-2PM2 Topol-M ICBM (SS-27 "Sickle B").

After the beginning of perestroika, demand for military production declined significantly, and the Pivdenmash product line was expanded to include non-military uses such as civilian machinery. One line of products added after 1992 are trolleybuses. Models include the articulated YuMZ T1 (1992–2008), its non-articulated brother YuMZ T2 (1993–2008) and more modern YuMZ E-186 (2005–2006) which features a low floor cabin. Leonid Kuchma, long-time chief manager (1986–1992) of the company, became the Prime Minister in 1992, and later President of Ukraine in 1994.

In addition to production facilities in Dnipro, Pivdenne Production Association includes the Pavlohrad Mechanical Plant, which specializes in producing solid-fuel missiles. Pivdenmash's importance was further bolstered by its links to Ukraine's former President Leonid Kuchma, who worked at Pivdenmash between 1975 and 1992. He was the plant's general manager from 1986 to 1991.

In February 2015, following a year of strained relations, Russia announced that it would sever its "joint program with Ukraine to launch Dnepr rockets and [was] no longer interested in buying Ukrainian Zenit boosters, deepening problems for [Ukraine's] space program and its struggling Pivdenmash factory". With the loss of Russian business some thought that the only hope for the company was increased international business which seemed unlikely in the time frame available. Bankruptcy seemed certain as of February 2015, but was averted.

In July 2022, during the 2022 Russian invasion of Ukraine, the Pivdenmash facility in Dnipro was struck by a Russian long-range cruise missile attack. The plant was targeted again during the October–November 2022 nationwide missile strikes on Ukraine on 17 November 2022.

Today 
On 14 August 2017, the Institute of International Strategic Studies issued a report presenting evidence that "North Korea has acquired a high-performance liquid-propellant engine from illicit networks in Russia and Ukraine", likely produced by Pivdenmash facilities.  Both the company  and the Ukrainian government denied the allegation.

An Antares launch vehicle using a Pivdenmash core was launched from Wallops Island in October 2016 to deliver supplies to the ISS. A Zenit launch vehicle was launched in December 2017, after a two-year hiatus, to deliver AngoSat 1.

In February–March 2018, Pivdenmash announced plans to develop a testing platform for Hyperloop that was scheduled for completion in 2019 in Dnipro. In September 2019, the (new) Minister of Infrastructure of Ukraine, Vladyslav Krykliy, cancelled this (according to him "absurd") project.

Structure 

 Factory of missile and aviation aggregates (created in 2010 through organization)
 Pavlohrad Mechanical Factory (located in Pavlohrad)
 Dnipro Tractor Factory
 Factory of Technological Equipment
 Production Complex "Metalurhiya"
 Production Complex "Pivdenmashenergo"
 Construction and Installation Complex
 Sports Complex Meteor
 Social and domestic administration
 Sanatoriums "Dubrava" (Bila Tserkva) and "Druzhba" (Alushta), Hotel Pivdennyi, Mashynobudivnykiv Palace of Culture
 Airline Pivdenmashavia

Military and space industry 
Pivdenmash is known for its military and space industry products, and earned the city of Dnipro the nickname of "Rocket City".

Missiles 
The company had been the key missile producer for Soviet ICBM and space exploration programs. Historic and Pivdenmash launch systems included:
 the R-5 Pobeda – the Soviet Union's first nuclear armed missile
 the R-12 Dvina theatre ballistic missile
 the R-14 Chusovaya theatre ballistic missile
 the R-16 – the first widely deployed ICBM of the Soviet Union
 the R-36 (8K67) ICBM
 the RT-20P, the first mobile ICBM (not deployed)
 the R-36orb, the first ICBM with orbital warhead (not deployed)
 the R-36M ICBM family (converted to Dnepr rocket)
 the MR-UR-100 Sotka ICBM family
 the 15A11 missile for Perimetr system
 the RT-23 Molodets ICBM family
 the Hrim-2 mobile short-range ballistic missile system

Space launch vehicles 
 Kosmos
 Dnepr
 Tsyklon (based on R-36/8K67)
 Tsyklon-2 
 Tsyklon-3 
 Tsyklon-4  
 Cyclone-4M 
 Zenit
 Boosters for Energia (based on Zenit first stage)

Rocket engines 
 RD-843

Automatic nuclear-control system 
 Dead Hand – A similar system existed in the U.S. known as the Emergency Rocket Communications System (ERCS)

Vehicles manufacturing 
Created in 1944 as Dnipropetrovsk Tractor Factory, it was later expanded.

Trolleybuses 
 YuMZ T1 (1992–2008)
 YuMZ T2 (1993–2008)
 YuMZ T2.09 (1998–2007)
 YuMZ E186 (2005–2006)
 Dnipro T103 (2013–present)
 Dnipro T203 (2017–present)

Tractors 
 YuMZ-2 (1954–1958)
 YuMZ-5 (1957–1962)
 YuMZ-6 (1971–2001)
 YuMZ 8040.2
 YuMZ 8244.2
 YuMZ 8080

See also 

 Pivdenne Design Bureau – a major missile designer closely co-operating with Pivdenmash
 State Space Agency of Ukraine

References

External links 

 English-language home page
 Makarov Pivdennyy (Yuzhnyy) Machine-Building Plant at the Nuclear Threat Initiative

 
Companies based in Dnipro
1944 establishments in Ukraine
Ukrainian brands
Aerospace companies of the Soviet Union
Defence companies of the Soviet Union
Trolleybus manufacturers
Aircraft component manufacturers of the Soviet Union
Bus manufacturers of Ukraine
Ukrainian space institutions
Aerospace companies of Ukraine
State Space Agency of Ukraine
Electric vehicle manufacturers of Ukraine
Government-owned companies of Ukraine
Spacecraft manufacturers
Companies of Ukraine
Defence companies of Ukraine
Rocket engine manufacturers of Ukraine
Manufacturing companies based in Dnipropetrovsk Oblast